is a crossover fighting game developed and published by Capcom. It is the fourth installment in the Marvel vs. Capcom series, which features characters from both Capcom's video game franchises and comic book series published by Marvel Comics. Originally released in Japanese arcades in 2000, the game received ports to the Dreamcast, PlayStation 2, PlayStation 3, Xbox, Xbox 360, and iOS devices over the span of twelve years.

In Marvel vs. Capcom 2, players select a team of characters from the Marvel and Capcom universes to engage in combat and attempt to knock out their opponents. While the game uses similar tag team-based game mechanics to the series' previous iteration, Marvel vs. Capcom: Clash of Super Heroes, it features several significant changes, such as three-on-three gameplay, a new character assist system, and a more simplified control scheme. The character artwork uses traditional 2D-animated sprites, while the backgrounds and visual effects are rendered in 3D. This makes Marvel vs. Capcom 2 the first game in the franchise to feature 2.5D graphics.

The game received positive reviews from critics, who praised its gameplay, visuals, and character roster, while criticizing its soundtrack and initial lack of online multiplayer support outside Japan. Since its release, it has been considered one of the best fighting games of all time as well as one of the greatest games of all time in general. Following its release, Capcom lost the use of the Marvel Comics license, putting the series on a decade-long hiatus. In April 2010, Capcom announced the development of a sequel, Marvel vs. Capcom 3: Fate of Two Worlds, which was later released in February 2011.

Gameplay

Marvel vs. Capcom 2: New Age of Heroes is the fourth installment in the Marvel vs. Capcom series of tag team-based fighting games. Players select a team of three characters to compete in a one-on-one battle, as opposed to teams of two characters in the series' previous entry, Marvel vs. Capcom: Clash of Super Heroes. The game introduces a more refined version of the "Variable System" used in past Marvel vs. Capcom games, which allows players to tag in other team members at any point during the match. Unlike Clash of Super Heroes, which features unplayable partner characters that the player can summon at will, Marvel vs. Capcom 2 re-implements the "Variable Assist" gameplay mechanic introduced in Marvel Super Heroes vs. Street Fighter, allowing players to call upon one of their off-screen team members to perform a single special move to aid them. Each playable character possesses three different types of assists, denoted by the Greek letters α, β, and γ, which can range from projectile attacks to healing moves. Assist characters receive extra damage if struck by the opponent. As characters fight, the team members not in play will also slowly regenerate their life gauges. A match lasts until one team completely runs out of vitality for all three fighters; if the match timer reaches zero before either team is knocked out, the player with the most remaining health is declared the winner.

Similar to prior installments, as characters deal and receive damage, a colored meter at the bottom of the screen known as the "Hyper Combo Gauge" will gradually fill. When the meter is full, the player can use it to perform several special techniques, such as "hyper combos", powerful attacks that deal heavy damage; "delayed hyper combos", which allow the player to execute multiple hyper combos consecutively; and "variable combinations", which summon the player's entire team to use their hyper combos simultaneously. The game also introduces a new gameplay mechanic called the "snapback", which forces the opponent to switch characters. Marvel vs. Capcom 2 features a modified version of the six-button control scheme from Clash of Super Heroes. Instead of six attack buttons separated as three pairs of low, medium, and high-strength punches and kicks, the game utilizes a setup of four attack buttons and two assist buttons.

Modes
Marvel vs. Capcom 2: New Age of Heroes features both single-player and multiplayer game modes. The game has an Arcade Mode, where the player must defeat seven AI-controlled teams to reach the final boss character, Abyss, who sports three different forms. Unlike previous games in the series, Marvel vs. Capcom 2 does not have character-specific endings, as the player will earn the same ending regardless of the characters they used to complete Arcade Mode. Versus Mode allows two players to compete against one another. Players can practice moves and combos in Training Mode, where they can also adjust certain settings, such as the number of bars available in the Hyper Combo Gauge. Score Attack, similar to Arcade Mode, pits the player against waves of AI-controlled characters; however, the main objective is to accumulate the highest score possible without the use of continues.

The arcade version of Marvel vs. Capcom 2 includes an experience system which unlocks hidden characters after a certain number of experience points are earned. This system was removed in the console versions in favor of the "Secret Factor" menu, where the player can buy hidden characters, stage backgrounds, and color schemes using points earned through normal play. The Xbox 360 and PlayStation 3 versions both featured online multiplayer, which includes player matches, ranked matches, and lobbies. The Japanese release of Marvel vs. Capcom 2 for the Dreamcast also featured online play through Capcom's "Match Service" network; however, it was limited to between two different Dreamcast systems.

Playable characters

Marvel vs. Capcom 2: New Age of Heroes contains a roster of 56 playable characters. The roster features characters from various Marvel Comics properties, such as The Avengers and X-Men, and Capcom video game franchises, including Street Fighter, Darkstalkers, and Mega Man. The game also introduces three original characters: Amingo, a cactus-like creature; Ruby Heart, a French-speaking air pirate; and SonSon, a bō-wielding monkey girl and granddaughter of the protagonist from the 1984 Capcom arcade game SonSon. In the arcade version of Marvel vs. Capcom 2, half of the characters are unlocked from the start while the other half are unlocked as revenue increases, while in the console versions of Marvel vs. Capcom 2, 24 characters are available from the start, while the remaining 32 characters must be unlocked using experience points; however, in the Xbox 360 and PlayStation 3 versions, all fighters are initially unlocked.

Marvel characters

Capcom characters

Development
On December 1, 1999, Capcom announced that a sequel to Marvel vs. Capcom: Clash of Super Heroes, titled Marvel vs. Capcom 2: New Age of Heroes, was in development. It was developed for the Sega NAOMI arcade board and the Dreamcast, Capcom's first attempt at a fighting game outside of the CP System II and III hardware systems. The game was the first in the Marvel vs. Capcom series to combine hand-drawn two-dimensional sprites upon three-dimensional backgrounds. The Japanese home and arcade versions of the game were revealed to be compatible with the Dreamcast VMU. Players were able to connect their VMU to the arcade version to exchange data, earning them experience points which could be used to unlock new characters, stages, and costume colors in the home version. The experience system included three types of points: "N-Points", earned by playing through the arcade version; "D-Points", gained by playing through the Dreamcast version; and "V-Points", obtained by playing online multiplayer. The game featured online play between two Dreamcast consoles through a specialized network known as "Match Service". The service, developed by Capcom and KDD Corp, used KDD-developed technology called "Data on Demand" as a foundation, which offered transfer rates below 70 milliseconds. These features were removed in all future domestic and international ports of Marvel vs. Capcom 2.

During a press conference prior to the Electronic Entertainment Expo 2002, Capcom unveiled its plans to bring Marvel vs. Capcom 2 over to the PlayStation 2 and Xbox consoles. While the PlayStation 2 version allowed players to compete against one another via USB modem connections, the Xbox version didn't feature Xbox Live support. Once again, online multiplayer was not available outside Japan. Online service was discontinued when Capcom began to dissolve its dial-up support in 2004.

Following the commercial and critical success of Super Street Fighter II Turbo HD Remix in 2008, Capcom stated its intentions to continue making high-definition remakes of its past games. When asked specifically about Marvel vs. Capcom 2, Capcom's vice president of business development and strategic planning, Christian Svensson, indicated that the game was their most requested title by fans. On April 27, 2009, Marvel and Capcom jointly announced that Marvel vs. Capcom 2 would be coming to the Xbox 360 through the Xbox Live Arcade and PlayStation 3 through the PlayStation Store. A demo was released on April 30 exclusively for the PlayStation Network. When questioned about the lack of a Wii port, Svensson stated that Capcom was unable to release the game on the console due to licensing restrictions and WiiWare's file size limit.

The PlayStation 3 and Xbox 360 ports were developed by Backbone Entertainment, who previously worked with Capcom on Super Street Fighter II Turbo HD Remix. The game was built using the original Dreamcast version's code base. The online functionality in Marvel vs. Capcom 2 utilized the same net code from Super Street Fighter II Turbo HD Remix. Additional changes for the PlayStation 3 and Xbox 360 versions included various filtering options for character sprites, labeled "Smooth", "Crisp", and "Classic". Widescreen support was implemented; since Marvel vs. Capcom 2 was originally designed with a 4:3 aspect ratio, the developers were able to widen the camera field of view. The ports also added independent music volume controls and support of custom soundtracks. Capcom offered a free downloadable hip hop mixtape as an alternative soundtrack for the game.

In April 2012, Capcom announced the release of Marvel vs. Capcom 2 for iOS devices. Capcom created two control configurations for iPhone and iPad touch screens. Players have a choice between the standard six-button layout, or a compact four-button control scheme with "flick controls". While the game does not support online play, a Versus Mode option is available over Bluetooth.

Release
Marvel vs. Capcom 2: New Age of Heroes debuted in Japanese arcades on the Sega NAOMI arcade platform in early 2000. The game was soon released on the Dreamcast in Japan on March 30, 2000, and North America on June 29; the European version, which was released on July 16, was published by Virgin Interactive. Marvel vs. Capcom 2 was ported to the PlayStation 2 on September 19, 2002, in Japan, November 19 in North America, and November 29 in Europe. The Xbox version launched alongside its PlayStation 2 counterpart in Japan on September 19, 2002, which later received a North American release on March 30, 2003. It was then released internationally through the Xbox Live Arcade on July 29, 2009, and the PlayStation Network on August 13. Lastly, the game became available for iOS devices on April 25, 2012.

On December 15, 2013, Capcom announced that Marvel vs. Capcom 2 would be removed from the Xbox Live Arcade and PlayStation Network stores towards the end of the month, following the apparent expiration of Capcom's licensing contracts with Marvel Comics. The game was pulled from the PlayStation Network on December 17 and 19 in North America and Europe, respectively, and from the Xbox Live Arcade globally on December 26. Eventually, the iOS version was also delisted from the Apple App Store.

On August 2, 2021, prominent fighting game community member Maximilian Dood began a hashtag campaign to gather support for re-releases of Marvel vs. Capcom 2 onto modern consoles after it was delisted from digital platforms. The campaign led to #FREEMVC2 trending on Twitter and Mike Mika, the studio head for video game developer Digital Eclipse, expressing interest in re-releasing the game. On August 5, 2022, Arcade1Up revealed a Marvel vs. Capcom 2 arcade cabinet during the 2022 Evolution Championship Series. The cabinet includes Wi-Fi connectivity for online multiplayer, as well as other games, including Marvel vs. Capcom: Clash of Super Heroes, Marvel Super Heroes vs. Street Fighter, X-Men vs. Street Fighter, Marvel Super Heroes, X-Men: Children of the Atom, X-Men: Mutant Apocalypse, and Marvel Super Heroes in War of the Gems.

Reception

Upon release, Marvel vs. Capcom 2: New Age of Heroes received positive reviews for its frantic gameplay style, detailed backdrops and visuals, and enormous cast of playable characters. In Japan, Game Machine listed it on their April 15, 2000 issue as being the most-successful arcade game of the month. Anoop Gantayat of IGN praised the game for its refined battle system, despite its sheer level of insanity, labeling it as "one of the best fighting games out there". Game Revolution lauded the game for its character roster and crazy action, claiming that Capcom crafted an excellent sequel by combining "timeless gameplay, an ensemble cast, and hyper energy". The site also praised the graphics for creating a "2.5D graphical wonder that is candy for the eyes". Jeff Gerstmann of GameSpot praised the new control scheme and the addition of three-on-three combat; he concluded that fans of the previous games would be pleased with the changes made in Marvel vs. Capcom 2.

The early Dreamcast, PlayStation 2, and Xbox versions of Marvel vs. Capcom 2 were criticized for their lack of online support outside Japan. Gerstmann commented that online multiplayer would have added a lot to the game's appeal. In his Xbox review, Aaron Boulding of IGN was particularly critical over its exclusion, citing Capcom's failure to deliver on its promise for Xbox Live support as the reason for his low score. However, following the release of the PlayStation 3 and Xbox 360 ports, critics praised the game for providing a smooth online multiplayer experience. Topher Cantler of Destructoid praised the network performance, calling it "outstanding" and "flawless". Wesley Yin-Poole of VideoGamer.com stated that the addition of online play made the game "an essential purchase".

Across all platforms, many reviewers cited the jazz-inspired soundtrack as the game's biggest flaw. Jeremy Dunham of IGN described the music as "plain god-awful", stating that the "jazzy lounge lizard music and snappy beats" did not fit the action in the slightest. Martin Taylor of Eurogamer expressed his disappointment that the game's visual flair was backed by "a horrific, lift music-oriented soundtrack and low quality sound effects". Game Revolution shared the sentiment, declaring it as "some of the lamest music that you've ever heard".

Reviewing the Dreamcast version, Blake Fischer of Next Generation wrote that "overall, this is the best 2D fighting experience available on a console. If you have a Dreamcast and you can't wait for SF: Third Strike, this is the game to get." The game was a runner-up for GameSpots annual "Best Fighting Game" award, which went to Capcom vs. SNK: Millennium Fight 2000.

Over the years since its release, Marvel vs. Capcom 2 has repeatedly been included by various critics into their lists of the best fighting games ever, including ScrewAttack at GameTrailers in 2007, where it placed second, and Virgin Media in 2009, where it placed third. It was declared the best 2D fighting game by Complex in 2011 and 2013. In 2013, the game was also named as the most iconic Marvel video game by Nerdist. In 2010, GamePro also chose it as the 33rd best PS2 game of all time. The PlayStation 3 and Xbox 360 versions of the game sold 1.4 million units before their removal on December 15, 2013.

Sequel

Following the release of Marvel vs. Capcom 2: New Age of Heroes, Capcom was unable to retain the Marvel Comics license due to legal issues over copyright, placing the series on indefinite hiatus. However, on April 20, 2010, ten years after the game's original debut, Capcom announced the development of a sequel: Marvel vs. Capcom 3: Fate of Two Worlds. Production of Marvel vs. Capcom 3 was headed by Ryota Niitsuma, who had previously worked with Capcom on Tatsunoko vs. Capcom: Ultimate All-Stars. While it utilizes largely similar game mechanics to Marvel vs. Capcom 2, the sequel features new methods of play designed for newcomers to the fighting game genre, such as the addition of a simplified three-button control scheme. Marvel vs. Capcom 3 was released in February 2011 for the PlayStation 3 and Xbox 360.

References
Notes

Footnotes

External links
  (re-release)
 
 

2000 video games
Arcade video games
Crossover fighting games
Dreamcast games
Fighting games used at the Evolution Championship Series tournament
Marvel vs. Capcom
Multiplayer and single-player video games
PlayStation 2 games
PlayStation 3 games
IOS games
PlayStation Network games
Tag team videogames
Video game sequels
Video games developed in Japan
Video games scored by Tetsuya Shibata
Video games with custom soundtrack support
Virgin Interactive games
Xbox games
Xbox 360 games
Xbox 360 Live Arcade games
Products and services discontinued in 2013
2D fighting games
Delisted digital-only games